Hart's Rules for Compositors and Readers at the University Press, Oxford (now published as New Hart's Rules) is a reference book and style guide published in England by Oxford University Press (OUP). Hart's Rules originated as a compilation of best practices and standards by English printer and biographer Horace Hart over almost three decades during his employment at other printing establishments, but they were first printed as a single broadsheet page for in-house use by the OUP in 1893 while Hart's job was controller of the university press. They were originally intended as a concise style guide for the staff of the OUP, but they developed continuously over the years, were published in 1904, and soon gained wider use as a source for authoritative instructions on typesetting style, grammar, punctuation, and usage.

Hart's Rules has been revised and republished under different titles, including The Oxford Guide to Style (2002), The Oxford Style Manual (2003, also including The Oxford Dictionary for Writers and Editors of 2000), New Hart's Rules (2005, an updated but abridged, pocket-size version), and New Oxford Style Manual (2012, inclusive of New Hart's Rules and The New Oxford Dictionary for Writers and Editors of 2005, together notably shorter than the 2003 combined edition).  A revised second edition of New Hart's Rules (without the Dictionary) was released in 2014, and a second New Oxford Style Manual was compiled in 2016, using the 2014 versions of both of the individual volumes.

Publishing history
After their first appearance, Hart's rules were reissued in a second edition in 1894, and two further editions in 1895. They were continually revised, enlarged and reissued, and had reached their 15th edition by the time they were eventually published as a book in March 1904. New editions and reprints continued to appear over almost eight decades, until the 39th edition (1983) which was reprinted fifteen times—the last in 2000. Three of these reprints included corrections: 1986, 1987, and 1989. 
 
In February 2002, Oxford University Press published a new and much longer version (what would have been the 40th edition of Hart's) under the title The Oxford Guide to Style and the editorship of Robert M. Ritter, promoted as "Hart's Rules for the 21st Century". 

The Oxford Style Manual (2003) combined in a single volume, of 1056 pages, The Oxford Guide to Style (2002) and The Oxford Dictionary for Writers and Editors (2000).

From this version was adapted New Hart's Rules: The Handbook of Style for Writers and Editors, first published in September 2005. While New Hart's Rules (NHR) rewrites some material from the 2002/2003 version, it also abridged some, to fit into its small format.

The Oxford Dictionary for Writers and Editors, also compiled by Ritter, had been available since 2000 as a separate companion volume to Hart's, in line with the eleven editions of the dictionary's famous predecessor, the Authors' and Printers' Dictionary by Frederick Howard Collins (first published in 1905 and renamed in 1983). A freshly compiled successor, published in 2005, returned to the "traditional small handbook form", matching New Hart's Rules, and is titled The New Oxford Dictionary for Writers and Editors. It is intended for "people who work with words—authors, copy-editors, proofreaders, students writing essays and dissertations, journalists, people writing reports or other documents, and website editors." This edition was reprinted with a new cover in 2014, to match a make-over of various Oxford reference publications. It is distinct from the similarly titled [New] Oxford Dictionary for Scientific Writers and Editors (originally 1991; 2nd edition, 2009), a companion volume of technical terminology not included in any of the compilation editions.

In 2012, Oxford University Press published a new combined edition, New Oxford Style Manual (2nd Edition). It includes New Oxford Dictionary for Writers and Editors and New Hart's Rules: The Handbook of Style for Writers and Editors, both from 2005.

A second edition of NHR, under the full title New Hart's Rules: The Oxford Style Guide, was published in October 2014, under new editor Anne Waddingham.  Another combined edition, again titled New Oxford Style Manual (3rd Edition), was released in March 2016, with the content of the 2014 editions of New Hart's Rules and New Oxford Dictionary for Writers and Editors, and matching their cover style. New Oxford Dictionary for Scientific Writers and Editors (2009) remains a separate volume.

See also
 Fowler's Modern English Usage
 The King's English
 Oxford Standard for Citation of Legal Authorities (OSCOLA), often called Oxford style or Oxford style guide.

References

 The Oxford Manual of Style (OUP, 2001) Introduction
 The Meaning of Everything (OUP, 2003)

External links
 New Hart's Rules – sales specification at the OUP
 New Oxford Dictionary for Writers and Editors: The Essential A–Z Guide to the Written Word – sales specification at the OUP

1893 non-fiction books
Academic style guides
Oxford University Press books
Style guides for British English